Ebodina elephantodes is a moth of the family Tortricidae. It is found in Java and Taiwan.

References

Polyorthini
Moths of Indonesia
Moths of Taiwan
Moths described in 1938
Taxa named by Edward Meyrick